Ottawa South is a provincial electoral district (riding) in the Canadian province of Ontario, in the city of Ottawa.

History
The district was created in 1925 from part of Ottawa West. Prior to the 1999 election, the provincial district did not have the same borders as the federal district.

Prior to the 1967 redistribution, the riding shared no common area with the present riding. Present day Ottawa South could be found in the riding of Russell prior to 1967.

After having been firmly conservative for the first 60 years, it has been in the hands of the Liberals without interruption since 1987. From 1987 to 2013, it was held by two generations of the McGuinty family–father Dalton Sr. from 1987 to 1990 and son Dalton Jr. from 1990 to 2013.

Members of the Provincial Parliament

Election results

2018-

2014 general election

2013 by-election

Dalton McGuinty resigned the Premiership of Ontario in February 2013, but decided to stay on as MPP of Ottawa South until the next election. McGuinty changed his mind however, and resigned on June 12 amid the "gas plant scandal".

Opinion polls

Results

Elections 1926-2011

1954-1966: Ward 5 (Old Ottawa South, the Glebe) and that part of Wards 4 (Centretown) and 6 (Dalhousie Ward) south of Sparks Street and Wellington Street (West).

1933-1954: Capital Ward, Dalhousie Ward, Central Ward, Wellington Ward, that part of Riverdale Ward west of Main Street and that part of Elmdale Ward east of Parkdale Avenue.

1925-1933: Dalhousie Ward and Capital Ward

2007 electoral reform referendum

Riding associations

Riding associations are the local branches of the provincial political parties: 

Sources
Map of riding for 2018 election

References 

Provincial electoral districts of Ottawa